Judah Hurwitz (1734–1797) was a Jewish physician and author living in Amsterdam, Netherlands in the 18th century. Born in Vilnius, Lithuania, he was the son of Mordechai Hurwitz. In 1766, his then popular work Ammudei Beit Yehuda (translated as Pillars of the House of Judah) was published by Yehuda Leib Sussmans in Amsterdam. Although Hurwitz's stated intention in the book is to defend the theology and practice of traditional Judaism, he is often considered an early member of the Haskalah.

External links
Original Hebrew text of Ammudei Beit Yehuda
The early Jewish Enlightenment in the Netherlands, and Hurwitz's place in therein 
Ammudei Beit Yehuda in the Library of Congress

1734 births
1797 deaths
Lithuanian Orthodox Jews
Dutch Orthodox Jews
Physicians from Vilnius
Lithuanian emigrants to the Netherlands
People of the Haskalah